The ZMC-2 (Zeppelin Metal Clad 200,000 cubic foot capacity) was the only successfully operated metal-skinned airship ever built. Constructed at Naval Air Station Grosse Ile by The Aircraft Development Corporation of Detroit, the ZMC-2 was operated by the U.S. Navy at Lakehurst, New Jersey from 1929 until its scrapping in 1941. While at Lakehurst it completed 752 flights, and logged 2265 hours of flight time.

Development
The ZMC-2 was built in Grosse Ile, Michigan by the Aircraft Development Corporation, a division of Detroit Aircraft Corporation, on a site shared with, and later acquired by Naval Air Station Grosse Ile. The ZMC-2 was the brainchild of Ralph Hazlett Upson, a balloonist and engineer who had previously won the Gordon Bennett Cup for balloon racing in Europe, bringing the cup to the United States for the first time. Upson teamed up with Carl B. Fritsche of Detroit and together they formed the Detroit Aircraft Corporation, with backing from Henry Ford and Edsel Ford, as well as Charles Kettering of General Motors, Alex Dow, president of Detroit Edison, and William B. Stout, a local industrialist. Chief of hull design was the young Czech-American designer Vladimir Pavlecka.

The airship was constructed in a special hangar built in 1925 for the construction of the ZMC-2, and expandable for the construction of much larger metal-clad airships the company envisioned would be produced later. It remained the largest structure on the Naval Air Station property until 1960, when it was dismantled and the roof reused in the construction of a bowling alley in nearby Trenton, Michigan.

The ZMC-2 was nicknamed the "Tin Bubble" and was also sometimes called a "tinship". The skin was not tin but Alclad. The airship was roughly teardrop shaped and had eight small stabilizer fins, four of which had rudders. It was held together with over 3.5 million rivets, which were applied by an innovative sewing machine-like device which produced airtight seams.

The control car was  feet long by  feet wide. The ZMC-2 was powered by two Wright Whirlwind J5 engines of  each, carried on outriggers and mounted in a tractor arrangement, rather than the pusher position usually employed on blimps. At first the landing gear was an unusual hollow steel ball about the size and shape of an American football, mounted on a tripod attached to the car. This was done to create a shape with less drag in order to guarantee the Navy's requirement of a  top speed. Later, after the ZMC-2 had attained this speed with ease, the ball was replaced with a conventional swivelling soft tire.

The crew consisted of a pilot, copilot and flight engineer-navigator, with space for one or two additional passengers.

Assembly
The ZMC-2 was constructed out of Alclad, corrosion resistant aluminium sheet formed from high-purity aluminium surface layers metallurgically bonded to high strength aluminium alloy core material. The result was about as strong as carbon or mild steel. The downside was that Alclad was thicker than sheet aluminum, making the ship several hundred pounds heavier than originally envisioned. The aircraft was already under construction, and over 20 feet of the nose completed using duraluminum when the decision was made to switch to Alclad. The reason for the switch was that duraluminum is highly susceptible to corrosion, particularly in a salt water environment, the exact sort of environment a Navy blimp operates in. The ZMC-2 was the first aircraft constructed from Alclad in the US, and no previous experience could be drawn upon for its handling.

To assemble the ZMC-2 a skin-riveting machine was developed by the Aviation Tool Co., a division of the Detroit Aircraft Corporation. The device was invented by Edward J. Hill, who had come to work on the ZMC-2 after leaving the Naval Aircraft Factory in Philadelphia, Pennsylvania. The machine consisted of an aluminum casting, weighing about 100 pounds, and was supported on springs from a framework that ran on concentric circular rails set into the floor of the hangar. There were two sets of circular rails, one at each end of the building. Three riveting machines were made, one for each set of tracks, and one for reserve when repairs might be needed. The reason for two sets of tracks was that the hull was built in two sections, front and rear. In this manner, each end of the ship slowly grew as succeeding rows were added, looking like a bulls eye at first and later like a huge inverted teacup. Both sections were under construction continuously 24 hours a day, seven days a week, once the hull was started.

The riveting machine fed three small aluminum wires from large spools to make a seam about a quarter inch wide composed of three rivets, one above the other in a staggered pattern. In theory the machine could sew about 50 feet of seam in an hour, but in practice about 10 or more feet was the average. The sheets of Alclad used were eight to nine thousandths of an inch thick. As the each section of the hull grew internal annular rings were added at appropriate distances to give stiffness and reinforcement to the hull skin. In addition, lightweight longitudinal channels were added between the circular rings, giving the internal structure the appearance of a huge bird cage.

The helium gas was contained by the hull only, no fabric was used to contain the helium. Inside the hull were two large airbag cells, called ballonets, made of rubberized fabric and containing air. These cells could be expanded or contracted to control pressure as the helium expanded or contracted with the heating or cooling of the atmosphere or to adapt to changes of atmospheric pressure with altitude, and to control fore and aft trim. In operation the ZMC-2 was susceptible to heating and cooling effects of the sun causing it to pop and buckle in the evenings if pressure from blowers was not applied. During its service life the ZMC-2 was found to have a gas diffusion rate much lower than that of fabric-hulled blimps, meaning that a much longer time would pass before additional helium needed to be added.

As the airship neared completion a decision had to be made on how best to fill it with helium. Once the two halves were completed they were suspended horizontally from cables attached to the hangar ceiling, and the two halves were joined with a final array of rivets. Since helium mixes freely with air and is hard to separate from it, it was impractical to pump helium directly into the airship until the air was removed. It was decided that the airship would first be filled with carbon dioxide (CO2), a heavy gas that mixes less freely with helium and which is easier to separate from helium. Once filled with CO2 the helium could be pumped in under pressure from valves at the top of the chamber, forcing the CO2 out through valves located on the bottom, and then recovering any helium that did mix with it. Only a few weeks before this procedure was to begin a bright young engineer noted that once filled with CO2 the ZMC-2 would be many thousands of pounds heavier than when filled with air. The rest of the airship's assembly had to be postponed for several weeks while additional reinforcing panels and stronger connectors were attached in order to support the increased weight of the CO2 filled airship.

Operations
The airship was first flown on August 19, 1929, and transferred to Lakehurst, New Jersey in October 1929. The airship was nicknamed "the Tin Blimp". Its first Navy skipper was Red Dugan, who expressed reluctance at operating the airship, believing it unsafe. Dugan's concerns were proven wrong, though he later lost his life in the crash of another airship, Akron.

It was considered very successful as a sub-scale test vehicle, but the company that built it did not weather the Great Depression well, and by the time a successor might have been built, there was little interest in pursuing it. In the year before the Depression, the U.S. Army was seeking funding for an airship based on the ZMC-2, that would have been larger than the German Graf Zeppelin, and powered by eight engines of }. The U.S. Army planned to use it as a tender for air-launched aircraft, similar to plans the U.S. Navy had for future dirigibles. The $4.5 million need for construction was never approved by Congress.

With its low fineness ratio of 2.83, the ZMC-2 was difficult to fly. In its lifetime the ZMC-2 logged 752 flights and 2265 hours of flight time. In its final years its use had dropped significantly. Between December 1938 and April 1941 it only logged five hours of flight time.

Considered by the Navy as too small for anti-submarine patrols, the aging ZMC-2 was decommissioned and scrapped in 1941 after nearly 12 years of service.

Operators
USA
 United States Navy

Specifications (ZMC-2)

ZMC-2 in popular culture
The ZMC-2 plays a key role in the Clive Cussler novel Cyclops (1986) in which it is fictionally saved from scrapping and renamed Prosperteer.

See also

 List of airships of the United States Navy
 David Schwarz

Notes

References

External links
 Lakehurst: International Airport (a picture of the ZMC-2 is near the bottom of the page)
 ZMC-2 in hangar, under the nose of the Hindenburg
 This has a short history of the ZMC-2 along with pictures of construction and flights of the ZMC-2

Airships of the United States Navy
1920s United States aircraft